The 2008 Michigan House of Representatives elections were held on November 4, 2008, with partisan primaries to select the parties' nominees in the various districts on August 5, 2008. , this remains the last time the Democrats won a majority in the Michigan State House.

Results

Districts 1–28

Districts 29–55

Districts 56–83

Districts 84–110

See also 
Michigan Legislature
United States congressional delegations from Michigan

References

External links 
Michigan Department of State
State of Michigan
Michigan Representatives
Gongwer News Service – Michigan
Michigan Information & Research Service

House of Representatives
2008
Michigan House of Representatives
November 2008 events in the United States